The Annali di Matematica Pura ed Applicata (Annals of Pure and Applied Mathematics) is a bimonthly peer-reviewed scientific journal covering all aspects of pure and applied mathematics. The journal was established in 1850 under the title of Annali di scienze matematiche e fisiche (Annals of Mathematics and Physics), and changed to its current title in 1858: it was the first Italian periodical devoted to mathematics and written in Italian. The founding editors-in-chief were Barnaba Tortolini and Francesco Brioschi.
It is currently published by Springer Science+Business Media and the editor-in-chief is Graziano Gentili (University of Florence).

Abstracting and indexing 
The journal is abstracted and indexed in:

According to the Journal Citation Reports, the journal has a 2020 impact factor of 0.969.

Notes

References
.

External links 
 

Mathematics journals
Publications established in 1850
English-language journals
Springer Science+Business Media academic journals
Bimonthly journals